Colleen Kay Hutchins (May 23, 1926 – March 24, 2010) was Miss America 1952.

Early life
Hutchins was a native of Arcadia, California. Her brother, Mel Hutchins, later became a basketball player for the Milwaukee Hawks, Fort Wayne Pistons, and New York Knicks.

Pageantry
Hutchins was crowned as Brigham Young University's homecoming queen in 1947. In September 1951, she was crowned as Miss America, the first Miss Utah to win the pageant.

Personal life
Hutchins met future husband Ernie Vandeweghe at a New York Knicks basketball game at Madison Square Garden after a friend introduced her to the team's forward. The couple married in May 1953, and had four children: son, Kiki, a professional basketball player and executive; daughter, Tauna, an Olympic swimmer, son, Bruk; and daughter, Heather. Hutchins is also the grandmother of professional tennis player CoCo Vandeweghe, daughter of Tauna. She was a member of the Church of Jesus Christ of Latter-day Saints.

The Vandeweghes resided in Indian Wells, California, Laguna Beach, California and Palm Springs, California.  She died on March 24, 2010, in Newport Beach, at age 83.

References

Sources
 Garr, Arnold K., Donald Q. Cannon and Richard O. Cowan ed., Encyclopedia of Latter-day Saint History, p. 526

1926 births
2010 deaths
Latter Day Saints from Utah
Miss America winners
Brigham Young University alumni
People from Palm Springs, California
People from Arcadia, California
People from Salt Lake City
Miss America Preliminary Talent winners
People from Indian Wells, California
Vandeweghe family
Latter Day Saints from California